Niitvälja is a village in Lääne-Harju Parish, Harju County in northern Estonia.

Baltics first 18-hole golf course is located in Niitvälja.

References

Villages in Harju County